Eremophila demissa is a flowering plant in the figwort family, Scrophulariaceae and is endemic to a small area of central Western Australia. It is a low, spreading shrub with small, yellowish grey leaves and branches and mauve to blue flowers.

Description

The petal tube is light purple to mauve on the outside, darker on the petal lobes and whitish inside with faint purple spots. Part of the outside of the petal tube and petal lobes are hairy and the inside of the tube is filled with long, soft hairs.

Taxonomy and naming
Eremophila demissa was first formally described by Robert Chinnock in 2007, and the description was published in Eremophila and Allied Genera: A Monograph of the Plant Family Myoporaceae. The specific epithet (demissa) is a Latin adjective meaning "drooping", "weak" or "feeble" referring to the growth habit of this species.

Distribution and habitat
This eremophila occurs in an area near Meekatharra where it grows on clay flats and silcrete.

Conservation status
Eremophila demissa is classified as "not threatened" by the Government of Western Australia Department of Parks and Wildlife.

References

demissa
Eudicots of Western Australia
Plants described in 2007
Endemic flora of Western Australia
Taxa named by Robert Chinnock